In bioinformatics, lncRNAdb is a biological database of Long non-coding RNAs The database focuses on those RNAs which have been experimentally characterised with a biological function. The database currently holds over 290 lncRNAs from around 60 species. Example lncRNAs in the database are HOTAIR and Xist.

See also
 Long non-coding RNA

References

External links
 

RNA
Non-coding RNA
Biological databases